Penang Chinese High School (PCGHS) (Malay: Sekolah Menengah Jenis Kebangsaan China Pulau Pinang) is a  secondary school in Penang, Malaysia. Often referred to as "Bīn huá" among the local Chinese community in Penang. The school provides continuous education, ranging from pre-primary or kindergarten to pre-university studies. PCGHS is now an academy that is widely known across the globe.

History
17 March 1919
Proposal by 4 prominent members of the Hokkien Community—Mr. Tan Sin Chen, Mr. Lim Lu Tek, Mr. Khor Sen Lee and Mr. Cheah Seng Tin, to establish a school for Chinese girls. This fact still stands as the number of non-Chinese among its enrolment and alumni is next to none. The proposal was [unanimously approved and the Fukien Girls' School was established. Originally, the school was intended to be opened on 15 January 1920, but was delayed due to a number of problems among which were the lack of teachers and pupils.

8 March 1920
Official opening of Fukien Girls' High School at Macalister Road.

11 March 1951
Fukien Girls' School was renamed as the Penang Chinese Girls' High School and the primary school was renamed as the Penang Chinese Girls' Primary School.

January 1956
The students attend their classes at the new school building at 2, Gottlieb Road

1962
The school accepted full government aid. As a consequence, the school was divided into 2 sections—a national-type school and an independent high school (for overaged pupils).

1963
A kindergarten was opened. Thus, the school now provides continuous education from kindergarten to school certificate.
(UPSR for primary level, SPM for secondary level and STPM for pre-university level)

Sports Houses
Penang Chinese Girls' High School has five sport houses:
 Red House
 Yellow House
 Blue House
 Green House
 Purple House

References

Educational institutions established in 1919
1919 establishments in British Malaya
Secondary schools in Malaysia
Girls' schools in Malaysia
Chinese-language schools in Malaysia
Buildings and structures in George Town, Penang
Publicly funded schools in Malaysia
Schools in Penang